John FitzRoy may refer to:

Lord John FitzRoy (1785–1856), British MP
John FitzRoy, 9th Duke of Grafton (1914–1936), English peer, kinsman of the above